National Bingo Night is an Indian game show, based on the American game show of the same name, produced by Urban Brew Studios which schedule to premiere on Colors TV on 23 January 2010. The show is hosted by Indian actor Abhishek Bachchan. The first celebrity guest on the show was Amitabh Bachchan, the father of the show's host.

Overview
National Bingo Night is marketed as an interactive experience for both the studio audience and viewers at home. Members of the studio audience attempted to win a game of bingo while competing against a solo studio contestant as well as live television audience.

Rules 
In each episode, two fast-paced, rounds of BINGO are played. The contestant plays one of many in-studio games, which is driven by the game ball numbers (1-75). The nation can play alongside the studio contestant by crossing out the numbers on their own 'National Bingo Night' tickets.

Each Ticket is only applicable for the Game number specified on it. Every episode of the Game Show will have two games: a Yellow Ticket Game and a Green Ticket Game. The host announces the game number and colour of the ticket to be played on at the beginning of each Game. The home viewer has to circle the numbers announced by the host that are taken out of the dome, if they appear on their ticket. Viewers are instructed not to poke a hole in their tickets, or scratch out or strike-through the numbers. All the balls/numbers that are taken out will be displayed on the television screen from time to time during the game.

Marketing 
National Bingo Night, had teaser campaign running in the form of Abhishek Aaram Classes where individuals could take a quiz of being lazy, sign a lazy petition earn a certificate for being lazy or the coined term being aarami. The show was first unveiled to viewers via a teaser campaign and witnessed the host, Abhishek Bachchan associated with 'Abhishek's Aaram Classes'.

Celebrity guests

References

External links
 Official Website
 Download Bingo Tickets
 Colors TV
 Abhishek Aaram Classes

Indian game shows
Bingo
Indian reality television series
Colors TV original programming
2010 Indian television series debuts
2010 Indian television series endings